The 1832 Kentucky gubernatorial election was held on August 6, 1832.

Incumbent National Republican Governor Thomas Metcalfe was term-limited, and could not seek a second consecutive term.

Democratic nominee John Breathitt defeated National Republican nominee Richard A. Buckner with 50.77% of the vote.

Breathitt died on February 21, 1834, and was succeeded by Lieutenant Governor Whig James T. Morehead.

General election

Candidates
John Breathitt, Democratic, incumbent Lieutenant Governor of Kentucky
Richard A. Buckner, National Republican, former U.S. Representative

Results

Notes

References

1832
Kentucky
Gubernatorial